Akarthappa is a large village which is based in the Bhargama block of the Araria district of the state of Bihar. It has a total population of 2501 out of which 1286 are males and 1215 are females, as per the census of 2011. The location code number as per the Census of India is 221679.

Literacy rate
There is a total of 551 literate people in the village of Akarthappa out of which 345 are males and 206 are females. The nearest school is Ums Akar Thapa which runs from class 1 to class 8. The literacy rate of Akarthappa village was 28.56% compared to 61.80% of Bihar. In Akarthappa male literacy stands at 34.47% while the female literacy rate was 22.20%.

Demographics
The PIN code of Akarthappa is 854334 and the Post Office is K.Baijnathpur.

Railway
The nearest railway stations to Akarthappa are:
 Janakinagar- 11.16 Km
 Harapatti - 11.82 Km
 Rupauli  - 12.19 Km
 Banmankhi Junction - 13.7 Km
 MURLIGANJ - 14.87 Km
 Sukhasan Kothi - 15.3 Km
 Aurahi - 17.9 Km

Adjacent communities 
Akarthappa is surrounded with these nearby villages:
 Bhattaon Kamat
 Chiraiya
 Nawalganj Pitamber
 Baija Patti
 Peare Lal Chakla
 Newa Lal Chakla
 Bisaria
 Bisaria Patti
 Majrahi Chakla
 Bhargaon

References

Villages in Araria district